Moisés Dueñas Nevado (born 10 May 1981 in Béjar) is a Spanish former road racing cyclist, who competed professionally between 2002 and 2009, and then again from 2012 to 2015.

On 16 July 2008, just before the 11th stage of the Tour de France, the French Anti-Doping Agency (the AFLD) reported that he had tested positive for the banned substance Erythropoietin.

Dueñas retired from professional cycling at the end of 2015.

Major results

2002
 3rd Overall Circuito Montañés
1st Stage 3
2003
 5th Road race, UEC European Under-23 Road Championships
2004
 4th Overall Tour de l'Avenir
 9th Circuito de Getxo
 10th Subida a Urkiola
2005
 6th Overall Vuelta a Asturias
 8th Gran Premio de Llodio
 9th Overall Vuelta a Burgos
2006
 1st  Overall Tour de l'Avenir
1st Stage 6
 9th Route Adélie
2007
 1st Overall Regio-Tour
1st Stage 2
 6th Overall Route du Sud
 6th Overall Vuelta a Burgos
2008
 7th Overall Vuelta a Castilla y León
2010
 2nd Overall Cinturó de l'Empordà
1st Stage 1
 5th Overall Vuelta Ciclista a León
2011
 7th Overall Vuelta Ciclista a León
2012
 3rd Overall Vuelta Ciclista a León
1st Stage 4
 6th Overall Tour du Gévaudan Languedoc-Roussillon
 9th Prueba Villafranca de Ordizia
2013
 3rd Overall Tour des Pays de Savoie
2014
 6th Tour du Jura
 10th Overall Tour of Hainan
2015
 5th Overall Troféu Joaquim Agostinho

See also
 List of doping cases in cycling

References

External links
Personal page

1981 births
Living people
People from Béjar
Sportspeople from the Province of Salamanca
Cyclists from Castile and León
Doping cases in cycling
Spanish sportspeople in doping cases
Spanish male cyclists